Taras Kiktyov (7 November 1986 – 16 July 2012) was a Ukrainian professional football player.

Career
Kiktyov made his professional debut in the Ukrainian Second League in 2004 for FC Metalist-2 Kharkiv. After his initial professional stint he played for different Ukrainian First League clubs.

Death
On 16 July 2012 Kiktyov died due to an unspecified heart disease.

References

External links
 

1986 births
2012 deaths
Ukrainian footballers
FC Metalist Kharkiv players
FC Metalist-2 Kharkiv players
FC Hoverla Uzhhorod players
FC Helios Kharkiv players
PFC Sumy players
FC Dynamo Khmelnytskyi players
Ukrainian Premier League players
Association football midfielders